The 2012–13 American Eagles men's basketball team represented American University during the 2012–13 NCAA Division I men's basketball season. The Eagles, led by 13th year head coach Jeff Jones, played their home games at Bender Arena and were members of the Patriot League. They finished the season 10–20, 5–9 in Patriot League play to finish in a tie for fifth place. They lost in the quarterfinals of the Patriot League tournament to Army.

Roster

Schedule

|-
!colspan=9| Exhibition

|-
!colspan=9| Regular season

|-
!colspan=9| 2013 Patriot League men's basketball tournament

References

American Eagles men's basketball seasons
American